Troides rhadamantus, the golden birdwing, is a birdwing butterfly that inhabits the Philippines. The species was first described by Hippolyte Lucas in 1835. There are many subspecies on islands of the Philippines and some authors consider Troides plateni and Troides dohertyi as subspecies of T. rhadamantus.

Related species
Troides rhadamantus is a member of the Troides aeacus species group. The members of this clade are:

Troides aeacus (C. Felder & R. Felder, 1860)
Troides magellanus (C. Felder & R. Felder, 1862)
Troides minos (Cramer, [1779])
Troides rhadamantus (H. Lucas, 1835)
Troides dohertyi (Rippon, 1893)
Troides prattorum (Joicey & Talbot, 1922)

References

External links

Nagypal, Tony "Troides rhadamantus". The World of Birdwing Butterflies. Archived September 9, 2018.

rhadamantus
Butterflies of Asia
Lepidoptera of the Philippines
Butterflies described in 1835